Battle of Autun may refer to:

Battle of Autun (532)
Battle of Autun (640s)

See also
Siege of Autun